Man or Gun is a 1958 American Western film directed by Albert C. Gannaway and written by Vance Skarstedt and James J. Cassity. The film stars Macdonald Carey, Audrey Totter, James Craig, James Gleason, Warren Stevens and Harry Shannon. The film, shot in Naturama was released on May 30, 1958, by Republic Pictures.

Plot

Cast
Macdonald Carey as 'Maybe' Smith / Scott Yancey
Audrey Totter as Fran Dare
James Craig as Pinch Corley
James Gleason as Sheriff Jim Jackson
Warren Stevens as Mike Ferris
Harry Shannon as Justin Corley
Jil Jarmyn as Mrs. Pinch Corley
Robert Burton as Deputy Sheriff Burt Burton
Ken Lynch as Buckstorm Corley
Karl Davis as Swede 
Julian Burton as Billy Corley
Carl York as Jack Corley
Harry Klekas as Dodd
Mel Gaines as Diego
Ron McNeil as Nick
Larry Grant as Jake

References

External links 
 

1958 films
American Western (genre) films
1958 Western (genre) films
Republic Pictures films
1950s English-language films
Films directed by Albert C. Gannaway
1950s American films